The Aqua Diary is a 1998 music documentary film starring the members of the Danish-Norwegian dance music group Aqua.

Synopsis
The film is a comprehensive video history of Aqua, about their early days in the mid-1990s, when they were called Joyspeed as well as the personal lives of Lene Grawford Nystrom, Rene Dif, Soren Nystrom Rasted, and Claus Norreen. The film also shows footage from the band's concerts as well as a glimpse behind the stage. The film also contains the music videos for "Roses Are Red", "Barbie Girl", "Doctor Jones", "Lollipop", "My Oh My", and "Turn Back Time". A clip of "Didn't I" is heard in this film.

Personnel
Lene Grawford Nystrom – female vocals
Rene Dif – male vocals
Soren Nystrom Rasted – keyboard, guitar
Claus Norreen – keyboard

Certifications

External links
Official website

Documentary films about pop music and musicians
1998 films
Aqua (band) video albums
1990s English-language films